Ribeirão dos Índios is a municipality in the state of São Paulo in Brazil. The population is 2,224 (2020 est.) in an area of 196 km2.

Demography 

Data from the Census-2000

Total Population - 2,222

Urban: 1,760

Rural: 462

Men: 1,144

Women: 1,078

Population Density (inhabitants/km2): 11.28

Infant Mortality (up to 1 year old per 1000): 14.48

Life Expectation: 71.98

Fertility rate (children per women): 2.06

Literacy Rate: 84.27%

Administration 

 Mayor - Jose Amauri Lenzoni (2005-2008)
 President of the Board - Aparecido de Almeida (2007-2008)

References

Municipalities in São Paulo (state)